The College of Southern Maryland (CSM) is a public community college with campuses in Hughesville, La Plata, Leonardtown, and Prince Frederick, Maryland.  It serves students living in Southern Maryland's Charles, St. Mary's, and Calvert counties.

History
In September 1958, the predecessor to today's CSM, Charles County Junior College, began evening classes at La Plata High School.  In 1960, the college added an apprenticeship program. In 1968, Charles County Community College began construction of the Career Education and Administration Building on what is now the main CSM campus in La Plata, Maryland.  On July 1, 2000, the college officially became the College of Southern Maryland.  CSM celebrated its fiftieth anniversary in 2008 with events marking its history.

Academics
The College of Southern Maryland offers more than 120 programs of study including Associate of Arts, Associate of Science, and Associate of Applied Science degree programs. CSM has more than 60 guaranteed transfer agreements with four-year colleges and universities. Furthermore, CSM offers a wide range of continuing education certificates and career training programs such as computer programming and repair, truck driving, and nursing.

Accreditation
CSM is accredited by the Middle States Association of Colleges and Schools. Its business, physical therapy, and nursing programs have specialized accreditation by Accreditation Council for Business Schools and Programs, American Physical Therapy Association, and National League for Nursing, respectively.

Campus and training facilities 
The Charles County facilities include the La Plata campus and a training center also in La Plata.  In conjunction with the University of Maryland University College, CSM operates the Waldorf Center for Higher Education in Waldorf.  The St. Mary's County campus is located in Leonardtown and a training center is located in Lexington Park.  The Calvert County campus is located in Prince Frederick.

La Plata campus 
The original campus of CSM houses a bookstore, cafeteria, conference center, a fine arts center with a 400-seat auditorium, a fitness center, computer laboratories, and a distance learning center.  The Southern Maryland Studies Center,
a regional archives repository and research center, is located in the CSM library.

Leonardtown campus 
The Community College of St. Mary's County was established in 1978 at Great Mills High School.  The campus was moved to its current location in 1997, which includes four buildings—Buildings A, B, C, and D. The campus has an auditorium/seminar room, science labs, and a wellness center, which is available for student and community use.

Prince Frederick campus 
The Community College at Calvert County, established in 1980, moved to its current location on J.W. Williams Road in Prince Frederick in 2005.  The main building is a two-story,  construction, which includes 15 classrooms, 6sixcomputer labs, and a  library. The B Building is a two-story  construction, which includes student services, seven computer labs and classrooms, the newly expanded wellness center, the Nuclear Energy Training Center, and is the college's first LEED certified building with four green roofs.

Regional Hughesville campus 
On February 27, 2013, the College of Southern Maryland announced it had purchased 74 acres in Hughesville to build another campus. The first phase was the construction of the  Center for Trades and Energy Training (CTET).

The second phase proposed for the campus includes a Center for Health Sciences.

 There is also a smaller center for classes a few miles north in Waldorf, Maryland.

Intercollegiate sports 
The College of Southern Maryland has six intercollegiate men's teams and six intercollegiate women's teams that compete in the NJCAA, Division II  The men's teams include basketball, lacrosse, soccer, baseball, tennis, golf, and cross-country. The women's teams include basketball, lacrosse, soccer, softball, tennis, volleyball, and cross-country.

References

External links 
 Official website

Two-year colleges in the United States
Universities and colleges in St. Mary's County, Maryland
Community and junior colleges in Maryland
Universities and colleges in Charles County, Maryland
Educational institutions established in 1958
1958 establishments in Maryland
Education in Calvert County, Maryland
NJCAA athletics